"Spinning the Wheel" is a song by English singer-songwriter George Michael. The song was co-written and co-produced by Michael and Jon Douglas. It was released on Virgin Records as the third single from Michael's third studio album, Older (1996), and depicts the worry of a lover whose partner is sexually promiscuous during the period when AIDS was newly discovered and rampant in the West. The song peaked at number two in the United Kingdom, kept off the top by the Spice Girls' "Wannabe". The single also peaked within the top 10 in Denmark, Hungary, Italy, and Spain where it spent 3 consecutive weeks at #1. 

"Spinning the Wheel" subsequently appeared on both of George Michael's compilations Ladies & Gentlemen: The Best of George Michael and Twenty Five.

Critical reception
Larry Flick from Billboard praised the Forthright-remix of "Spinning the Wheel" as a "hard-driving dance record", noting that the "sleek and jazzy interlude" from the Older album had been reconstructed "with a textured house music sound." He also complimented Michael for breaking "interesting new ground", and that the sophistication of the original recording "remains fully intact, though Forthright darkens the groove to complimentary effect". Sarah Davis from Dotmusic picked it as the album's "upbeat highlight", adding that it finds Michael "sending out warning signs to an errant partner": "Five o'clock in the morning, you ain't home ... I will not accept this as part of my life... I would rather be alone than watch you spinning the wheel for me". 

Swedish newspaper Göteborgs-Tidningen stated that it is "at least as good" as "Jesus to a Child" and "Fastlove".<ref>Göteborgs-Tidningen. 19 August 1996.</ref> Elysa Gardner from Los Angeles Times said that Michael "achieves a light jazz feel [on the song] that also makes for good background music". A reviewer from Music Week rated it four out of five, adding that this "balladic" follow-up to two number ones, "could just hit the spot again." Victoria Segal from NME noted its "brassy bleakness". Bob Waliszewski of Plugged In said that the singer "demonstrates 'tough love' on 'Spinning the Wheel' as he walks out on an adulterous woman." Ed Morales for Vibe'' wrote that "the singular swing of the trip-hoppy" song "is compelling".

Music video
A black-and-white music video was produced to promote the single, directed by Vaughan Arnell and Anthea Benton. It features Michael performing with a band in a club and was later published on Michael's official YouTube channel in September 2010. The video has amassed more than 6,1 million views as of October 2021.

Track listings
 Asian, Australian, European, and UK CD EP
 "Spinning the Wheel" (Radio Edit) – 4:57
 "You Know That I Want To" – 4:35
 "Safe" – 4:25
 "Spinning the Wheel" (Forthright Edit) – 4:41

 Asian, Australian, European, and UK CD "The Dance Mixes"
 "Spinning the Wheel" (Forthright Club Mix) – 8:11
 "Fastlove" (Forthright Edit) – 4:23
 "Spinning the Wheel" (Jon Douglas Remix) – 6:40

Charts and certifications

Weekly charts

Year-end charts

Certifications

References

1996 singles
1996 songs
Black-and-white music videos
George Michael songs
LGBT-related songs
Music videos directed by Vaughan Arnell
Number-one singles in Spain
Songs written by George Michael
Song recordings produced by George Michael
Virgin Records singles